The 2019 FAO League was the tenth season of the FAO League, the top Odia professional football league, since its establishment in 2010. Sunrise Club were the defending champions whereas Bidanasi Club were relegated from the Diamond League last season and played in the Gold League in the 2019 edition. The FAO League is annually organised by the Football Association of Odisha (FAO), the official football governing body of Odisha, India. The regular season started on 24 July.  Sunrise Club were the defending champions, ending up at the top with sixteen points having a positive goal difference of fifteen. Odisha Police ended their 2018 FAO League stage at the runners-up spot with sixteen points, having a positive goal difference of nine. 

Odisha Sports Hostel won their maiden title ending up at the top with sixteen points having a positive goal difference of seven. Rising Student's Club ended up as the runners up with fifteen points. In the Gold Division, Rovers Club topped the table with eleven points having a positive goal difference of nine. Rising Star Club ended their group stage campaign with eight points having a positive goal difference of one. In the Silver Division, SAI-STC and Club N Club qualified for the Silver Play-Off. However, Club N Club failed to put up a team for the play-off, hence SAI-STC were crowned as the champions of the Silver Division.

Teams

Diamond

Sunrise Club
Odisha Police
Sports Hostel
Rising Students Club
East Coast Railway
Radha Raman Club
Jay Durga Club
Young Utkal Club

Gold

Bidanasi Club
Rising Star Club
Rovers Club
Mangala Club
Radha Gobinda Club
Sunshine Club

Silver

Silver A

SAI-STC Cuttack
Chand Club
Lalbag Club
State Bank of India
Azad Hind Club

Silver B

Independent Club
Chauliaganj Club
Club N Club
Town Club
Royal Club

Venue

League stage

Diamond League

League table

 Note: Top four teams of Diamond League would qualify for the FAO Super Cup.

Results

Gold League

 Note: Top three teams of the Gold League would qualify for the FAO Super Cup.

Silver League

Group stage

Group A

Group B

Playoffs

Final

Statistics

Scoring

Top scorers

Hat-tricks

Own Goals
 Ajit Rout (Mangala Club)
 Bibhu Ranjan Nayak (State Bank of India)
 Emanuel Tirkey (Jay Durga Club)
 Kshitish Dansena (Club N Club)
 Md. Javed (Lalbag Club)

Awards

Most Valuable Player of the Match

Diamond

Silver

Group A

Group B

References

FAO League
Sports competitions in Odisha
Ind
1